Wat Khmer Palelai Monastery is a Cambodian Theravada Buddhist temple located in Philadelphia, Pennsylvania.
The monastery was founded in 1986 in a South Philadelphia row house. In 2010, the community acquired a 238,000-square-foot plot of land, where the current temple stands. The temple complex took nearly a decade to complete as the project was funded over time through donations from the local community.

Khmer New Years

References

Asian-American culture in Pennsylvania
Cambodian-American culture
Overseas Cambodian Buddhist temples
Buddhist temples in Pennsylvania
Buildings and structures in Philadelphia
Religious organizations established in 1986
1986 establishments in Pennsylvania